Chadha (also spelled as Chattha, Chatha, Chaddha and Chadda) is a surname that is used by Punjabi Khatri caste. 

According to a traditional account, the forefathers of Chadha Khatris fought with Babur in a battle. However, all of them died except for one person who hid behind an aak bush. This person continued the progeny of the Chadha clan. To pay tribute to the aak bush which saved the Chadha clan from extinction, the Chadhas visit Eminabad in Gujranwala district to perform prayers and worship the Aak tree as a former tradition.

Before partition of India, Chadha Khatris were found in Potohar, Sialkot, Gujranwala, Cambellpore, Rawalpindi, Jalandhar, Lahore, Gujrat district and Kabul (Afghanistan).

Chadhas are Hindus, Sikhs and Muslims. Many Chadda Khatris were followers of Guru Arjan such as Bhai Jattu, Bhanu, Tirtha, Nihala. Many Chadha Khatris were followers of Guru Hargobind. Baba Sodal who was given the status of an "infant god" in Doaba Punjab was born in a Chadha Khatri family. Every year, a fair is organized in Jalandhar to commemorate his death anniversary.

Notable persons

Activists 
 Ena Chadha, Indo-Canadian human rights lawyer, investigator, author and educator.
 Satya Rani Chadha, women's rights activist. She is known for launching the anti dowry movement in India in the 1980s.

Actors 
 Richa Chadda, Indian actress
Sahila Chadha, Indian actress
Sheeba Chaddha, Indian actress
Shyam Chadda, Indian veteran actor

Armed forces 
 Mahip Chadha, former colonel in Indian army and writer on military history.
 Puneet Chadha, Rear admiral in Indian Navy and serving flag officer of the Indian Navy. He currently serves as the Additional Director General of the National Cadet Corps.

Artists 
Ankit Chadha.  Indian writer, story-teller, oral narrative performance artist.
Gurinder Chadha, Oscar winning British film director
Hersh Chadha, photographer
Jagriti Chadha, Indian-American designer
Mahip Chadha, Indian writer
Navin Chaddha, Indian dialogue writer who won Filmfare Award for Best Dialogue for Oye Lucky! Lucky Oye!
Sarbjit Singh Chadha,  Indian singer, who is said to be the first non-Japanese enka singer.

Athletes 
 Matt Chahda, Indian-Australian race driver
 Ramesh Chadha, Indian cricketer
 Ravinder Chadha, Indian cricketer

Economists and scientists 
 Anju Chadha,  Indian biochemist. She is a professor at Indian Institute of Technology Madras.
 G. K. Chadha, Indian economist and academician for more than 40 years. He was the founding President of South Asian University, New Delhi. 
 Jagjit Chadha, British economist who is the Director of the National Institute of Economic and Social Research.
 Krishna Lal Chadha, Indian horticultural scientist, author and a former National Professor of the Indian Council of Agricultural Research.

Entrepreneurs 
 Baljit Singh Chadha, Canadian businessman and president and founder of Balcorp Limited
 Ponty Chadha, Indian businessman who owned the Wave Group
 Rattan Chadha, Dutch businessman and CEO of Mexx
 Rohit Chadda, Indian entrepreneur, who serves as the CEO of the digital business at Essel Group (Zee Entertainment) and co-founder of Foodpanda

Politicians 
 Dinesh Chadha, Indian AAP politician
 Gurmukh Singh Musafir, former Chief Minister of Punjab
 Raghav Chadha, Indian AAP politician
 Renu Chadha, Indian BJP politician
Hamid Nasir Chattha, Pakistani veteran politician from Punjab, Pakistan
Akmal Saif Chatha, member, Provincial Assembly of the Punjab, Pakistan

See also
Immigration and Naturalization Service v. Chadha, a 1983 decision of the U.S. Supreme Court

References

External links

Indian surnames
Surnames of Indian origin
Surnames of Pakistani origin
Punjabi-language surnames
Hindu surnames
Khatri clans
Khatri surnames